The timeline shows changes of the head of the executive branch of the municipality of Pichilemu from its creation in May 1894 until today.

1894–1950

1950–2000

2000–present

Notable
 Presidents died before the end of term:
Serafín López Lizana
 the shortest and longest terms:
Osvaldo Sotomayor Ilabaca (9 days) and José María Caro Martínez (11 years)
 Most non-consecutive periods:
Francisco Javier Asalgado, Sergio Morales Retamal, Carlos Echazarreta Iñiguez (two), and Felipe Iturriaga Esquivel (three)

See also
 Mayor of Pichilemu

Pichilemu
Mayors of Pichilemu
 
Government of Pichilemu
Mayors of Pichilemu